Adolf Hubert van Scherpenzeel-Thim (1824 – 1877) was Mayor of Neutral Moresnet, a small neutral territory, from 21 February 1859 until 30 May 1859. Having served less than 4 months, he was the territory's shortest-serving mayor.

References

Mayors of Moresnet
1824 births
1877 deaths
Neutral Moresnet